RoboWarrior, known in Japan as , is an action puzzle video game developed by Hudson Soft, and co-developed by Aicom, making it their first NES game they worked on, and published by Jaleco for the Nintendo Entertainment System and the MSX.

Plot
RoboWarrior takes place on an alien planet called Altile which was created by scientists as a solution to the overpopulation problem of Earth.
During a peaceful period on Altile, Robowarriors are decommissioned from Earth and the Xantho empire invades Altile and try to transform it for personal gain.

The player operates a cyborg named ZED (Z-type Earth Defence). In the game, ZED raids Altile to fight the Xantho empire and destroy its leader, Xur. ZED deploys bombs to clear a path through rocks, walls, and forests, while killing enemies and collecting items. Some gameplay elements resemble those of Bomberman (1983).

The original Japanese plot of Bomber King is similar, but with some distinct differences. In the year 2036 on the planet Altile, the weather and climate suddenly drastically change due to some mysterious reason. The combat android Knight is sent to the planet to try and track down whatever force is causing the changes and defeat it.

Gameplay
RoboWarrior comprises five level formats and there are 27 levels in the game. In one, the player must obtain a key before the time limit expires. In another, the key is unavailable until the player acquires a crystal or chalice. Some levels are cast in darkness, rendering obstructions invisible unless the player has a lit lamp. Still other levels are mazes in which a player must find and blast-through weak points in walls to proceed. Periodically, a player engages a boss level. Multiple bombs are required to bomb certain unconventional areas. Robowarrior also features water stages. Enemies respawn in each stage allowing the player to stock up on bombs. ZED is controlled via an overhead viewpoint and the player can move him in four directions.

In 1991, Sunsoft published a sequel to Bomber King for Game Boy, titled Bomber King Scenario 2.

References

External links

1987 video games
Hudson Soft games
Jaleco games
MSX games
Nintendo Entertainment System games
Science fiction video games
Single-player video games
Top-down video games
Video games developed in Japan
Video games scored by Takeaki Kunimoto
Aicom games
Video games set on fictional planets
ZAP Corporation games